Taka Aono is a Japanese drift driver currently (as of February 2009) competing in the American Formula D series in his Toyota Sprinter AE86 Trueno.
Before his professional drifting career began, Taka was a successful autocross driver, and was instrumental in building southern California's drift scene.  Taka was previously sponsored by Falken Tires, however he has since lost his sponsorship deal due to an unsuccessful season in 2008. Taka is also known to have given up a career as a chiropractor to become a drift driver.

Taka is now sponsored by Nexen Tire and Megan Racing.

Other Activities 
Taka Aono participated in Project Car Tuner Magazine's Toyota Corolla Drift Project, contributing time, expertise, and parts.

References

External links
 Formula D Profile

Drifting drivers
Japanese racing drivers
Formula D drivers
Living people
Year of birth missing (living people)